This is a list of the Iraq national football team results from 1980 to 1989.

Results

1980s
1980

1981

1982

1983

1984

1985

1986

1987

1988

1989

See also
Iraq national football team results

References

External links
Iraq fixtures on eloratings.net
Iraq on soccerway.com

1980s in Iraqi sport
1980